The year 1658 in music involved some significant events.

Events 
Johann Jacob Froberger leaves Vienna for the last time.
Sir William Davenant's "operatic show," The Cruelty of the Spaniards in Peru, is staged at the Cockpit Theatre in London during the summer.

Publications
Antoine de Cousu – Musique universelle, contenant toute la pratique, et toute la théorie
Johann Jacob Froberger – Libro terzo, A-Wn Mus.Hs.16560
Henry Lawes – Ayres and Dialogues for One, Two and Three Voyces, vol. 3
Etienne Moulinié – Meslanges de sujets Chrestiens ... avec une basse continue, a collection of sacred music

Classical music 
Johann Rudolf Ahle -- Ich hab's gewagt
Louis Couperin – Ave Maris Stella, OL 9
Andreas Hammerschmidt – chorale: Meinen Jesum laß ich nicht, after Christian Keymann's hymn
Jean-Baptiste Lully – Ballet d'Alcidiane, LWV 9

Opera
Johann Caspar Kerll – Applausi Festivi

Births 
April 22 – Giuseppe Torelli, Italian composer (died 1709)
October 11 – Christian Heinrich Postel, librettist (died 1705)
date unknown 
Maria Francesca Nascimbeni, Italian composer (died 1680)
Johann Georg Rauch I, composer (died 1710)
probable – Jean Desfontaines, composer (died c.1752)

Deaths 
March – Valentin Dretzel, composer
September 17 – Georg Philipp Harsdörffer, lyricist
August 11 – Antoine de Cousu, composer and theorist
August 27 – Stefano Fabri, Jr., musician 
November 15 – Jacobus Revius, lyricist
probable 
Dario Castello, Italian composer (born c.1590)
Henry Ferrabosco, English court musician

References

 
17th century in music
Music by year